Tauala elongata is a species of jumping spider.

Appearance
The species is similar to T. lepidus.

Name
The specific name is derived from the form of the elongated oval abdomen of the new species.

Distribution
Tauala elongata is only known from Taiwan.

References
  (2002): Four new and two newly recorded species of Taiwanese jumping spiders (Araneae: Salticidae) deposited in the United States. Zoological Studies 41(3): 337-345. PDF

Salticidae
Spiders of Taiwan
Endemic fauna of Taiwan
Spiders described in 2002